Live at Hamer Hall is the second live album by Australian indie blues rock band The Teskey Brothers with Orchestra Victoria. The album was announced in October 2021 and released on 3 December 2021. The album features songs from their two studio albums and two new Christmas songs. It debuted at number 11 on the ARIA Charts.

At the AIR Awards of 2022, the album was nominated for Best Independent Blues and Roots Album or EP.

At the 2022 ARIA Music Awards, the album was nominated for  Best Blues and Roots Album.

Background and release
On 22 December 2020, The Teskey Brothers performed a live-streamed digital concert with Orchestra Victoria at Hamer Hall, Melbourne. The song reimagined by arranger Jamie Messenger.

Critical reception

Jeff Jenkins from Stack Music called it "a splendid live album" saying "the strings send their soulful sound soaring".

Dylan Marshall from The AU Review said "Live at Hamer Hall isn’'t a traditional live album in the way you'd normally expect a 'live' album to be recorded, and it's for this reason the album doesn't quite reach the heights you'd hope it would. Sure it's polished and sounds outstanding, but lacks the body and vibe you'd want and hope for from a live album".

Track listing

Personnel
The Teskey Brothers are:
 Josh Teskey – vocals & guitar
 Sam Teskey – guitar
 Liam Gough – drums
 Olaf Scott - piano, organ
 Nicholas Buc - conductor

Charts

References

2021 live albums
The Teskey Brothers live albums
Live albums by Australian artists
Ivy League Records albums